The Galloway by-election of 9 April 1959 was held after the death of Unionist Member of Parliament (MP) John Mackie:

The seat was safe, having been won by the Unionists at the 1955 general election by 8,014 votes

Result of the previous general election

Result of the by-election

Aftermath
The Glasgow Herald stated that the initial reaction to the result among the political parties was "Government satisfaction, Liberal jubilation, and Labour despondency."  However, the same newspaper also noted that Conservatives would be happy to have held the seat with a "substantial majority", the Liberal performance would worry them. The result indicated that the Liberals were maintaining their recent trend of polling well in by-elections. The Conservatives were reported to fear that if this trend in Liberal candidates taking votes from their party continued, it could allow Labour to win the next general election, if the Liberals fielded 200 candidates.

References

1959 in Scotland
1950s elections in Scotland
By-election, 1959
By-election, 1959
1959 elections in the United Kingdom
April 1959 events in the United Kingdom
By-elections to the Parliament of the United Kingdom in Scottish constituencies